Juedai Shuangjiao is a Taiwanese television series adapted from Gu Long's novel of the same title. The series was first aired on TTV in Taiwan in 1977.

Cast
 Hsia Ling-ling as Xiaoyu'er / Hua Yuenu
 Chiang Ming as Hua Wuque / Jiang Feng
 Chang Lu as Tie Xinlan
 He Szu-min as Su Ying / Murong Jiu
 Betty Pei as Yaoyue
 Yin Pao-lien as Lianxing
 Wu Heng as Yan Nantian
 Chao Tzu-ching / Chu Hui-chen as Tie Pinggu
 Ke Lei as Zhang Jing
 Tsao Chian as Jiang Biehe
 Ching Hung as Jiang Yulang
 Lei Ming as Yin Ping
 Chin Shih as Du Sha
 Shen Hsueh-chen as Tu Jiaojiao
 Tsui Fu-sheng as Li Dazui

Production
The series was considered to be a major production by TTV at that time because most of the actors in the television station were involved in the project. Hsia Ling-ling was initially selected by Gu Long for the role of Tie Xinlan, but she ended up playing Xiaoyu'er instead. Gu Long praised Hsia's performance as "a classic of the classics". Su Ying and Murong Jiu, originally two different characters in the novel, were combined as a single role (played by He Szu-min) in the series to add a touch of creativity. News of Gu Long having an affair with Chao Tzu-ching surfaced when the series was being aired in 1977. Chao was heavily criticised in the media for being a "third party" as Gu Long was already married. Gu Long had previously constantly asked the screenwriters to give Chao a bigger role on screen. After the scandal was exposed, Chao was fired from the project and replaced by Chu Hui-chen. The screenwriters also changed the script to make Chao's character, Tie Pinggu, become disfigured.

References

External links

Works based on Juedai Shuangjiao
Taiwanese wuxia television series
1977 Taiwanese television series debuts
1970s Taiwanese television series
Television shows based on works by Gu Long